Elkhorn Creek is a  long 3rd order tributary to the Banister River in Halifax County, Virginia.

Course 
Elkhorn Creek rises in a pond at Shockoe, Virginia in Halifax County and then flows generally northeast to join the Banister River about 1.5 miles southwest of Leda.

Watershed 
Elkhorn Creek drains  of area, receives about 45.5 in/year of precipitation, has a wetness index of 402.58, and is about 62% forested.

See also 
 List of Virginia Rivers

References 

Rivers of Virginia
Rivers of Halifax County, Virginia]
Rivers of Pittsylvania County, Virginia]
Tributaries of the Roanoke River